Nicotinate dehydrogenase (cytochrome) (nicotinic acid hydroxylase, nicotinate hydroxylase) is an enzyme with systematic name nicotinate:cytochrome 6-oxidoreductase (hydroxylating). This enzyme catalyses the following chemical reaction

nicotinate + a ferricytochrome + H2O  6-hydroxynicotinate + a ferrocytochrome + 2 H+

This two-component enzyme from Pseudomonas belongs to the family of xanthine dehydrogenases.

See also 
 Nicotinate dehydrogenase

References

External links 
 

EC 1.17.2